Ministry of Finance of the Marshall Islands is a government ministry in the Marshall Islands responsible for providing a management system for public finances to manage revenue and fiscal functions of the Government of the Marshall Islands.

The ministry was established in 1990 under the 11 MIRC Chapter 1 Financial Management Act.

Ministers of finance

See also
Government of the Marshall Islands
Economy of the Marshall Islands

References

Government of the Marshall Islands
Economy of the Marshall Islands
Marshall Islands
1990 establishments in the Marshall Islands